Frederick A. Laskey is a Massachusetts government official, who currently serves as the Director of the Massachusetts Water Resources Authority, and previously served as the Secretary of Administration and Finance of Massachusetts from 1998 to 1999.

Career 
Before becoming the Secretary of Administration and Finance of Massachusetts in 1998, Laskey served as Senior Deputy Commissioner of the Massachusetts Department of Revenue from 1994 to 1998, and was designated by the Commissioner to serve as Assistant Secretary in the Executive Office for Administration and Finance.

Personal life 
Laskey holds a degree in political science and history, from University of Massachusetts at Boston.

References 

Year of birth missing (living people)
Living people